Bonnie-Jill Laflin (born March 15, 1976) is an American actress, model, television personality and sportscaster. Laflin has also worked as an actress and most notably as a scout for the Los Angeles Lakers, making her the league's first female scout. She was also assistant general manager of the Lakers NBA Development League team.

Biography 
Laflin grew up in San Francisco, California, the daughter of a law enforcement officer and began modeling as a child with her mother. She started dancing at age 2 and studied with the San Francisco Ballet. She first gained public attention as a cheerleader with the Golden State Warriors of the NBA and is a former San Francisco 49ers and Dallas Cowboys Cheerleader in the National Football League, earning a Super Bowl ring with the 49ers

Laflin's work as a cheerleader and model helped her into television with recurring roles on Baywatch in the 1998–1999 season and Ally McBeal in 2000. She then became a TV personality, hosting Spike TV's Hotlines and ESPN's United Rockcrawling & Off-Road Challenge Series. Laflin was also a correspondent for Prime 9 News with KCAL-TV in Los Angeles, California, (2003), and a correspondent for ESPN's Cold Pizza. Her accolades in the sports industry also include broadcasting jobs for CBS, Fox, BBC and NFL Network. She is the creator and host of a basketball TV show for China, Muho TV (spoken in English with Chinese subtitles). Laflin played Dierks Bentley's love interest in CMT's 2005 Sexiest Video of the Year, "Come a Little Closer". In 2005, she appeared as one of the suitcase-holding models during the airing of the opening week of Deal or No Deal on NBC. Laflin was ranked #89 on the Maxim Hot 100 Women of 2005. She has also worked as a model for Frederick's of Hollywood and Venus Swimwear, and her print campaigns include Coors Light, Bacardi, Wrangler, FedEx, McDonald's Doritos, Carl's Jr and Nike And currently an ambassador and host for Air Jordan, Laflin has been featured in several magazines including FHM, Maxim, GQ, Sports Illustrated, ESPN the Magazine, Women's Health, Fitness RX, Origin and New Beauty. She was named among the Top Hooters Girls as part of the restaurant chain's 25th anniversary in 2008. Laflin was a cast member on season 6 of VH1's Basketball Wives.

Laflin has worked with the Los Angeles Lakers as a professional basketball scout, making her the league's first female scout, and as one of the two assistant general managers of the Lakers' developmental team, the Los Angeles D-Fenders. She received 5 NBA Championship rings during her time with the Lakers. On March 7, 2012, she announced that she and Kareem Rush would pair up in a fantasy basketball sports radio program on SiriusXM named The Rush Hour. The show launched on October 23, 2012; the show was renewed for 2013. Laflin's other radio shows include Playboy Fantasy Football on Sirius/XM and University of Texas pre- and post-football game shows for ESPN Austin. Laflin has appeared on the ABC game show To Tell The Truth "and was a guest on Larry King Now

Laflin currently hosts "Bonnie-Jill Laflin's The Weekly Pass" on Afterbuzz TV, the first ever sports show on the network. Since September 2018 she is now a regular host on KNBR's Murph and Mac show. As of March 2019 she is concurrently also a television on air host and reporter for NBC Sports Bay Area.

Charity work 

In 2010, Laflin founded the charity Hounds and Heroes, a 501(c)(3) nonprofit dedicated to raising funds for military veterans, first responders and animals. She has traveled all over the world on 18 United Service Organizations and Goodwill Tours, including 8 to Iraq and Afghanistan, supporting the United States Armed Forces.

Clothing line 
Laflin has a clothing line, DoublePlay Sportswear, a women's sports apparel company.

Personal life 
Bonnie-Jill started her own Rodeo Flag Team called The Liberty Bells that features women cowgirlss that perform at rodeos, sporting events and parades. 

Laflin is a member of the Alameda County Sheriff's Mounted Posse. She performed in the 2023 Rose Bowl Parade. 

Laflin has rescued many domestic and farm animals that live on her parents' ranch. She is a vegetarian and has been featured on PETA posters.

She is a competitive barrel racer.

References

External links 

Interview with AskMen.com
"Former NFL Players Join Troops in Iraq" By Pfc. Cassandra Groce, USA / Special to American Forces Press Service, AmericaSupportsYou.mil, Tikrit, Iraq, February 7, 2006.

1975 births
Living people
American television actresses
Television personalities from San Francisco
American women television personalities
American basketball scouts
Female models from California
National Football League cheerleaders
Actresses from San Francisco
American cheerleaders
American film actresses
National Basketball Association cheerleaders
Los Angeles Lakers scouts
University of Texas at Austin alumni
20th-century American actresses
21st-century American actresses